Fabio Pittorru (24 August 1928 – 4 September  1995) was an Italian novelist, essayist, screenwriter, journalist and film director.

Biography 
Born in Ferrara, after the World War II Pittorru was very active in the local cultural scene, working as a documentarist and as a journalist. In the mid-1960s he moved to Rome, where he started a proficuous collaboration with  Massimo Felisatti, writing some successful giallo novels and several film screenplays. He was also very active on television, co-creating with Felisatti the crime TV-series Qui squadra mobile, and writing a number of screenplays for television films. In 1974, he wrote and directed  the commedia sexy all'italiana Amore mio spogliati... che poi ti spiego!.

Pittorru's literary works include biographies, historic essays and humorous novels.

Selected filmography 
 
     Blow Hot, Blow Cold, directed by Florestano Vancini (1970)
     The Weekend Murders, directed by  Michele Lupo (1970)
     When Men Carried Clubs and Women Played Ding-Dong, directed by  Bruno Corbucci (1971)
     The Night Evelyn Came Out of the Grave, directed by  Emilio P. Miraglia (1971)
     Shadows Unseen, directed by  Camillo Bazzoni (1972)
     The Red Queen Kills Seven Times, directed by Emilio P. Miraglia (1972)
     Fiorina la vacca, directed by  Vittorio De Sisti (1972)
     The Sicilian Checkmate, directed by Florestano Vancini (1972)
     Last Days of Mussolini, directed by  Carlo Lizzani (1974)
     The Body, directed by  Luigi Scattini (1974)
     Silent Action, directed by  Sergio Martino (1975)
     Calling All Police Cars, directed by  Mario Caiano (1975) 
     Waves of Lust, directed by  Ruggero Deodato (1975)
     Sexycop, directed by  Duccio Tessari (1975)
     El Macho, directed by Marcello Andrei (1977) 
     Nine Guests for a Crime, directed by Ferdinando Baldi (1977)

Books  
 Violenza a Roma, with Massimo Felisatti. Garzanti, 1973.
 Gli strateghi di Yalta, with Massimo Felisatti. Fabbri, 1974.
 La spartizione del mondo. Fratelli Fabbri, 1974.
 La Madama, with Massimo Felisatti. Garzanti, 1974. 
 Per vincere ci vogliono i leoni. with Massimo Felisatti. Mondadori, 1977. 
 Torquato Tasso: l'uomo, il poeta, il Cortigiano. Bompiani, 1982.
 Agrippina imperatrice: sorella di Caligola, moglie di Claudio, madre di Nerone. Camunia, 1986.
 Chi è senza peccato. Wilson, 1987.
 Ciano: i giorni contati. Leonardo, 1991.
 Il caso Vittoria Accoramboni. Net, 2004.

References

External links  
  

1928 births
1995 deaths
People from Ferrara
20th-century Italian non-fiction writers
20th-century Italian male writers
20th-century Italian screenwriters
Italian male screenwriters
Italian novelists
Italian essayists
Male essayists
Italian film directors
Italian male non-fiction writers
20th-century essayists